Misumenops bellulus is a species of crab spider in the family Thomisidae. It is found in the USA, Cuba, and the Virgin Islands.

References

Further reading

External links

 

Thomisidae
Articles created by Qbugbot
Spiders described in 1896